Alexander Fernandez is an American actor who is known primarily for his work on television, most notably as National Security Advisor Anthony Prado on Commander in Chief, Rafael "Rafi" Alvarez on Without a Trace, Roy Vickers on Dallas, or Pablo Diaz on Devious Maids. He was also series regular on ABC's short-lived crime drama Killer Women, playing the role of Luis Zea. He also had a small role in “Mayans MC.”

Career
He has made guest appearances on such series as House, The Closer, NCIS: Los Angeles, Army Wives, Prison Break, CSI: Miami, Cold Case, Heroes, The West Wing, The Good Wife  , The Shield and Devious Maids, Off the Map, among many others. He is also noted for his voiceover work in video games, especially as antagonist Maester Seymour Guado in Final Fantasy X, Mangus in Brütal Legend, Carlito Keyes in Dead Rising, and as Uka Uka in Crash Twinsanity, taking over the role from actor Clancy Brown. He was also the original voice of The Chief in the classic game Where in the World Is Carmen Sandiego?. He has also had roles in other video games, including Saints Row and Saints Row 2, James Bond 007: Everything or Nothing, Quantum of Solace, Splinter Cell: Double Agent, and Mercenaries 2: World in Flames. He has also voiced numerous characters in animation, including the films Tekkonkinkreet, Gen¹³, Vampire Hunter D and The Animatrix, and the series Family Guy, American Dad!, Spawn, Petshop of Horrors, and Ninja Scroll: The Series.

He appeared in Body of Proof episode "Hunting Party". In 2016, he appeared in two episodes of the Fox Network series Lucifer as Warden Perry Smith.

In 2017 he played the role of Sergeant Daniel Vega in "Genetics" the 11th episode of the 7the season of the CBS police procedural drama Blue Bloods.

Filmography

Film

Television

Video games

References

External links 
 

Living people
American male actors of Mexican descent
American male film actors
American male television actors
American male video game actors
American male voice actors
20th-century American male actors
21st-century American male actors
Year of birth missing (living people)